Songkhla United Football Club is a Thai professional football club based in Songkhla Province.

History

2009–2011 Buriram or early years
The club was founded in 2009 as Buriram Football Club (สโมสรฟุตบอลจังหวัดบุรีรัมย์) by the club president, Karuna Chidchob.

2012 moved to Songkhla
On 9 January 2012 it was announced that Thai Premier League side PEA. F.C. owner Newin Chidchob would buy out promoted Thai Division 1 League side Buriram F.C. . After Chidchob bought the club he sold the rights to Songkhla F.C.. Chidchob's reason for selling the rights to Songkhla F.C. was to help provincial football stating that Southern Thailand was the only area in Thailand that had never had a Thai Premier League side. After Songkhla F.C. got the rights to the team they requested from the Football Association of Thailand to move the club from Buriram Province to Songkhla Province. They hoped to change the name of Buriram F.C. to Wuachon United and to have two Songkhla teams, one competing in the Thai Division 1 League and the other Songkhla F.C. competing in the Thai Premier League.

On 20 May 2012, for the match Wuachon 1–4 Muangthong United, the highest attendance at Tinsulanon Stadium of 30,102 was recorded.

2013 united with the local team
In 2013, Wauchon United has decided to unit with the local team, Songkhla F.C., as Songkhla United.

In 2018, after Club-licensing didn't pass to play 2018 Thai League 3 Lower Region, the team is banned 2 years and Relegated to 2020 Thai League 4 Southern Region.

Timeline

Stadium and locations

Season by season record

P = Played
W = Games won
D = Games drawn
L = Games lost
F = Goals for
A = Goals against
Pts = Points
Pos = Final position

TPL = Thai Premier League
T2 = Thai League 2
T3 = Thai League 3

QR1 = First Qualifying Round
QR2 = Second Qualifying Round
QR3 = Third Qualifying Round
QR4 = Fourth Qualifying Round
RInt = Intermediate Round
R1 = Round 1
R2 = Round 2
R3 = Round 3

R4 = Round 4
R5 = Round 5
R6 = Round 6
GR = Group Stage
QF = Quarter-finals
SF = Semi-finals
RU = Runners-up
S = Shared
W = Winners

Honours

Domestic leagues
as Buriram Football Club era
Thai Division 1 League
 Winners (1) :2011
Regional League Division 2
 Winners (1) :2010
Regional League North-East Division
 Runners Up (1) :2010

References

http://www.siamsport.co.th/Sport_Football/141204_473.html

External links
Songkhla United F.C. – Official website

 
Association football clubs established in 2009
Football clubs in Thailand
Sport in Songkhla province
2009 establishments in Thailand

zh:花冲联足球俱乐部